

This is a list of the endemic flora of Puerto Rico. This list is sorted in alphabetical order by binomial names. Common names are in parentheses.

Apocynaceae
Forsteronia portoricensis
Tabernaemontana oppositifolia

Aquifoliaceae
Ilex cookii (Cook's Holly)
Ilex sintenisii (Sintenis' Holly)

Araliaceae
Dendropanax laurifolius
Schefflera gleasonii

Asclepiadaceae
Marsdenia elliptica
Matelea borinquensis
Matelea sintenisii
Matelea variifolia

Asteraceae
Chromolaena borinquensis
Critonia portoricense
Koanophyllon dolicholepis
Koanophyllon polyodon
Mikania odoratissima
Mikania porosa
Vernonia proctorii

Begoniaceae
Begonia decandra

Bignoniaceae
Crescentia portoricensis (Higuero de sierra)
Tabebuia haemantha

Boraginaceae
Cordia bellonis
Cordia wagneriorum (Luquillo Mountain manjack)

Bromeliaceae
Hohenbergia antillana

Buxaceae
Buxus portoricensis

Cactaceae

Harrisia portoricensis (Puerto Rico applecactus)

Campanulaceae
Lobelia assurgens var. portoricensis

Canellaceae
Pleodendron macranthum (Chupacallos)

Celastraceae
Maytenus ponceana

Clusiaceae
Clusia gundlachii

Cyatheaceae
Alsophila amintae
Alsophila bryophila  
Cyathea portoricensis

Cyperaceae
Eleocharis sintenisii

Ebenaceae
Diospyros sintenisii

Ericaceae
Lyonia truncata var. proctorii

Euphorbiaceae
Acalypha bisetosa
Acalypha portoricensis
Hieronyma clusioides

Fabaceae

Calliandra locoensis 
Neorudolphia volubilis
Poitea florida

Flacourtiaceae

Banara portoricensis

Gesneriaceae

Gesneria citrina
Gesneria cuneifolia
Gesneria pedunculosa

Icacinaceae

Ottoschulzia rhodoxylon (Palo de Rosa)

Lauraceae

Licaria brittoniana

Loranthaceae

Dendropemon bicolor

Magnoliaceae

Magnolia portoricensis
Magnolia splendens

Malpighiaceae

Heteropteris wydleriana
Stigmaphyllon floribundum

Malvaceae

Thespesia grandiflora (Flor de maga)

Marcgraviaceae

Marcgravia sintenisii (Bejuco de palma, Bejuco de lira, Bejuco de rana, Lira del Yunque, Pegapalma)

Melastomataceae

Henriettea membranifolia 
Heterotrichum cymosum
(?)Sagraea portoricensis (Puerto Rico hogwood)

Meliaceae

Trichilia triacantha (Bariaco)

Moraceae

Ficus stahlii

Myrtaceae

Calyptranthes acevedoi
Calyptranthes estremerae
Calyptranthes luquillensis (Luquillo Forest Lidflower)
Eugenia eggersii
Eugenia haematocarpa
Eugenia padronii
Eugenia stewardsonii
Marlierea sintenisii
Myrcia margarettae
Myrcia paganii
Psidium amplexicaule
Psidium sintenisii (Hoja Menuda)

Nyctaginaceae

Neea buxifolia

Orchidaceae

Brachionidium ciliolatum
Leochilus puertoricensis
Lepanthes caritensis
Lepanthes eltoroensis (Luquillo Mountain babyboot orchid) 
Lepanthes woodburyana
Lepanthes caritensis
Psychilis kraenzlinii
Psychilis krugii 
Psychilis monensis 
Lepanthes stimsonii

Passifloraceae

                             
Passiflora tulae

Phyllanthaceae

Hieronyma clusioides (Cedro Macho)

Piperaceae

Peperomia maxonii

Poaceae

Aristida chaseae 
Aristida portoricensis (Pelos del diablo)

Polygalaceae

Coccoloba rugosa
Polygala cowellii

Polygonaceae

Coccoloba pyrifolia
Coccoloba swartzii f. urbaniana

Polypodiales

Amauropelta inabonensis
Amauropelta rheophyta
Asplenium corderoanum
Goniopteris abdita
Goniopteris hildae
Goniopteris verecunda
Goniopteris yaucoensis
Tectaria estremerana

Rhamnaceae

Reynosia krugii
Rhamnus sphaerosperma

Rubiaceae

Antirhea obtusifolia
Antirhea portoricensis
Antirhea sintenisii
Mitracarpus maxwelliae 
Mitracarpus portoricensis
Randia portoricensis 
Rondeletia inermis

Salicaceae

Xylosma pachyphylla (Spiny logwood)

Sapindaceae

Thouinia striata

Sapotaceae

Chrysophyllum pauciflorum
Manilkara pleeana
Micropholis garciniifolia
Sideroxylon portoricense

Schizaeaceae

Anemia portoricensis

Schoepfiaceae

Schoepfia arenaria

Selaginellaceae

Selaginella krugii
Selaginella laxifolia

Simaroubaceae

Simarouba tulae

Solanaceae

Goetzea elegans
Solanum drymophilum (Erubia)

Styracaceae

Styrax portoricensis (Palo de Jazmin)

Ternstroemiaceae

Ternstroemia luquillensis (Palo Colorado)
Ternstroemia subsessilis

Thymelaeaceae

Daphnopsis helleriana

Urticaceae

Pilea leptophylla

Verbenaceae

Cornutia obovata

Zamiaceae

Zamia ambiphyllidia
Zamia portoricensis

See also
Fauna of Puerto Rico
List of endemic fauna of Puerto Rico
Grasses of Puerto Rico
San Juan Botanical Garden

Notes

References

Further reading

Three endemic Puerto Rican ferns

External links
Departamento de Recursos Naturales 

 List
 Puerto Rico
Endemic flora